Bayan-Öndör (Mongolian: rich plateau) may refer to:

Mongolia 
several Sums (districts) in different Aimags (provinces), Mongolia
 Bayan-Öndör, Bayankhongor  
 Bayan-Öndör, Orkhon
 Bayan-Öndör, Övörkhangai

China 
 , a sum (Township) in Ar Horqin Banner, Inner Mongolia